Pan Xiaoting (born 25 February 1982) is a Chinese professional pool player.

Professional biography 
She is the first Chinese woman to play full-time on the WPBA Tour, and has been nicknamed the "Queen of Nine-Ball".

WPBA Rookie of the Year in 2006 
Pan was named WPBA Rookie of the Year in 2006 and finished the season ranked #13. Pan won her first WPBA tournament at the 2007 Great Lakes Classic. Later she won the 2007 WPA World Nine-ball Championship held in Taoyuan City, Taiwan. Pan is a friendly rival of fellow Asian WPBA player Kim Ga-young; the two met in the finals of the 2007 Carolina Women's Billiard Classic, with Kim prevailing 7 to 6 in the WPBA's first all-Asian championship match. Kim and Pan finished the 2007 WPBA season ranked #2 and #3, respectively, behind perennially top-ranked Allison Fisher. Pan is also a good friend of Chinese snooker player Ding Junhui. In 2008, Pan won the BCA GenerationPool.com title on the WPBA tour, and in 2010 added a WPBA major to her resume at the Tour Championships. She went undefeated in Niagara Falls that year defeating Kim Ga-young of South Korea in the semi-finals 7–6, and Karen Corr of Northern Ireland 7–4 in the final.

Matches against Ronnie O'Sullivan 
In December 2013, Pan participated in an exhibition match (9-ball and snooker) against snooker ace Ronnie O'Sullivan in Yanzhou, which she won 7–6 in 9-ball and lost 2–1 in snooker 6-red.

In November 2018, a second exhibition match between Pan and O'Sullivan took place in China, as well. The professional 9-ball champion Pan won with 7-6

Titles
 2010 Asian Games Nine-ball Singles
 2008 All Japan Championship 9-Ball
 2007 WPA Women's World Nine-ball Championship
 2005 All Japan Championship 9-Ball
 2002 All Japan Championship 9-Ball

References

External links 
 Short presentation of Xiaoting PAN
 Some 32 minutes of the 2018 match between Xiaoting Pan and Ronnie O'Sullivan

1982 births
Asian Games bronze medalists for China
Asian Games gold medalists for China
Asian Games medalists in cue sports
Chinese pool players
Cue sports players at the 2006 Asian Games
Cue sports players at the 2010 Asian Games
Female pool players
Living people
Medalists at the 2006 Asian Games
Medalists at the 2010 Asian Games
People from Jining
Sportspeople from Shandong
World champions in pool
Participants in Chinese reality television series
21st-century Chinese women